The 2007 season is Pohang Steelers' 25th season in the K-League in South Korea. Pohang Steelers competed in K-League, League Cup and Korean FA Cup.

Squad

K-League

Regular season

Pld = Matches played; W = Matches won; D = Matches drawn; L = Matches lost; F = Goals for; A = Goals against; GD = Goal difference; Pts = Points

Play-off

Korean FA Cup

League Cup

Group A

Pld = Matches played; W = Matches won; D = Matches drawn; L = Matches lost; F = Goals for; A = Goals against; GD = Goal difference; Pts = Points

Squad statistics

Transfers

In

Out

Loan Out

References

Pohang Steelers
2007